Seattle University (SeattleU) is a private Jesuit university in Seattle, Washington. Seattle University is the largest independent university in the Northwestern United States, with over 7,500 students enrolled in undergraduate and graduate programs within eight schools.

History
In 1891, Adrian Sweere, S.J., took over a small parish school near downtown Seattle at Broadway and Madison. At first, the school was named after the surrounding Immaculate Conception parish and did not offer higher education. In 1898, the school was named Seattle College after both the city and Chief Seattle, and it granted its first bachelor's degrees 11 years later. Initially, the school served as both a high school and college. From 1919 to 1931, the college moved to Interlaken Blvd, but in 1931 it returned to First Hill permanently. In 1931, Seattle College created a "night school" for women, though admitting women was highly controversial at the time.

In 1948, Seattle College changed its name to Seattle University, under Father Albert A. Lemieux, S.J. In 1993, the Seattle University School of Law was established through the purchase of the Law School of the University of Puget Sound in Tacoma, and the School of Law moved to the Seattle campus in 1999.

In 2009, Seattle U completed its largest capital campaign, raising almost $169 million. This led to investment in the scholarship fund, academic programs and professorships, a fitness complex, an arts center, and the $56 million Lemieux Library and McGoldrick Learning Commons, completed in fall 2010.

Campus

Seattle University has a  campus in the city's First Hill neighborhood, east of downtown Seattle. Seattle University's campus has been recognized by the city of Seattle and EPA for its commitment to sustainability through pesticide-free grounds, a food waste compost facility, recycling, and energy conservation program.

The Chapel of St. Ignatius on campus, designed by New York architect Steven Holl, won a national Honor Award from the American Institute of Architects in 1998. At night the chapel sends beacons of multi-colored lights out onto the campus.

The campus includes numerous works by well-known artists: the Centennial Fountain by Seattle artist George Tsutakawa; a large glass sculpture in the PACCAR Atrium of Piggot Hall by Tacoma artist Dale Chihuly; and works by Chuck Close, Jacob Lawrence, Gwendolyn Knight, William Morris, and David Mach.

Undergraduate enrollment in 2014 showed some ethnic diversity: 55.7% White, 23.4% Asian, 11.0% Hispanic, 10.7% other (international), 4.5% Black, 3.3% Pacific Islander, 1.6% Native American; some dual mention. 

The Lemieux Library was founded in 1991.  it contained 216,677 books and subscribed to 1,604 periodicals. It is a member of the American Theological Library Association.

Academics

Seattle University offers 65 bachelor's degree programs, 31 graduate degree programs, and 27 certificate programs, plus law school and a doctoral program in education. The university consists of eight colleges: the College of Arts and Sciences, the Albers School of Business and Economics, the College of Education, the School of Law, the College of Nursing, the College of Science and Engineering, the School of New and Continuing Studies, and the School of Theology and Ministry. A Seattle University education is estimated to cost $150,000, although much of this is covered by financial aid.

Albers School of Business and Economics
Seattle University's Albers School of Business and Economics, started in 1945, was named after the Albers family. George and Eva Albers were frequent donors including Eva's bequest of $3 million to the school in 1971. Their daughter, alumna Genevieve Albers, has also made several bequests including a sponsored professorship. In 1967, the business school added an MBA program. The Albers School is accredited with the Association to Advance Collegiate Schools of Business (AACSB).

College of Arts and Sciences

The Seattle University College of Arts and Sciences is the oldest and largest undergraduate and graduate college affiliated with Seattle University. The college offers 41 undergraduate majors, 36 undergraduate minors, six graduate degrees, and one post-graduate certificate. Its graduate program in psychology is one of the few schools in the country to focus on existential phenomenology as a therapeutic method.

School of Law

Seattle University School of Law was founded in 1972 as part of the University of Puget Sound (UPS) in Tacoma, WA. In 1993 the University of Puget Sound and Seattle University agreed on a transfer of the law school to Seattle University; in August 1994 the transfer was completed and the school physically moved to the Seattle University campus in 1999. The 2019 U.S. News & World Report Law School rankings lists the school at number 122 in the nation overall, adding that the school has the number one legal writing program in the nation as well as top-20 rankings for its part-time program and its clinical programs.

College of Nursing
Seattle University's College of Nursing celebrated its 75th anniversary in 2010. It is housed in the renovated Garrand Hall, the site of the original Seattle College and the oldest building on campus. The  "state of the art" Clinical Performance Lab is located in the James Tower of Swedish on Cherry Hill, a few blocks away from the main campus. Undergraduate and graduate students use this lab to practice skills necessary for clinical nursing. The BSN and BS in Diagnostic Ultrasound programs accept transfer students from community colleges and other universities. The DNP program welcomes registered nurses with bachelor's degrees. The Advanced Practice Nursing Immersion program (APNI to DNP) offers an accelerated program for those with a bachelor's degree in another field.

College of Education
The College of Education was founded in 1935. It is accredited by the National Council of Accreditation of Teacher Education and the National Association of School Psychologists and approved by the National Association of School Psychologists.

College of Science & Engineering
The College of Science and Engineering focuses on basic sciences, mathematics, and their applications. Students can major in basic science disciplines, computer science, or one of the engineering courses – civil and environmental engineering, mechanical engineering, or computer and electrical engineering. Students may also obtain aninterdisciplinary general science degree, or prepare for graduate work in the health professions.

Environmental sustainability

Among Seattle University's many environmental undertakings, there are projects ranging from composting initiatives to water conservation. There are also solar panels on buildings, and a central recycling yard with an extensive recycling program. The university has been composting since 1995, and in 2003 it built the first composting facility in the state on an urban campus.

Seattle University received the Sustainability Innovator Award in 2007 from the Sustainable Endowments Institute for its pre-consumer food waste composting program and the Green Washington Award in 2008 from Washington CEO Magazine for its sustainable landscape practices and pre-consumer food waste composting program. The Princeton Review 's 2018 Green Rating rated the school as the #12 Green College in the country.

Seattle U's move to a pesticide-free campus began in the early 1980s when Ciscoe Morris, now a local gardening personage, was head of the grounds department. He put a halt to chemical spraying and in its place released more than 20,000 beneficial insects called lacewings to eat the aphids that had infested trees on campus. The success of this led to other pesticide-free gardening practices.

Athletics

Between 1950 and 1971, Seattle University competed as a Division I independent school. In the 1950s, the basketball team was a powerhouse with brothers Johnny and Eddie O'Brien, who led the team to a rare victory over the Harlem Globetrotters. In 1958, future NBA Hall of Famer Elgin Baylor paced a men's basketball team that advanced to the Final Four and defeated top-ranked Kansas State University before losing to the University of Kentucky. Seattle University was also a leader in the area of racial diversity, with an integrated squad known as "the United Nations team."

The success of men's basketball, in addition to men's golf and baseball, continued into the 1960s with players Eddie Miles, Clint Richardson, and Tom Workman who went on to successful careers in the NBA. The 1966 basketball squad gave Texas Western University its only defeat in a championship season celebrated in the film Glory Road.

During that time women's tennis star Janet Hopps Adkisson was the first female to be the top-ranked player for both the men and women nationally. In women's golf, Pat Lesser was twice named to the Curtis Cup in the mid-1950s and was later inducted into the State of Washington Sports Hall of Fame.

Before 1980, more than 25 Seattle U baseball players went on to play professionally in both the major and minor leagues. Men's golf and a Tom Gorman-led tennis team were also rated nationally. Gorman went on to lead the US Davis Cup team, where he captained a record 18 match wins and one Davis Cup title (1972) as a player and two more Davis Cup championships as a coach (1990 and 1992).

Seattle U joined the West Coast Conference in 1971. In 1980, it left the West Coast Conference and Division I membership and entered the NAIA, where it remained for nearly 20 years. In the late 1990s, President Fr. Sundborg started restoring the university's NCAA membership. The athletic program moved into Division II in the fall of 2002.

The school moved from Division II to Division I in 2009. Also in that year, the university hired men's basketball coach Cameron Dollar, former assistant at University of Washington, and women's coach Joan Bonvicini, former University of Arizona coach and one of the winningest women's college basketball coaches. In 2013, Coach Bonvicini led the Redhawks to the regular season Western Athletic Conference championship. In 2016, Suzy Barcomb was hired as the new coach for women's basketball after Coach Bonvicini resigned in March 2016. In her first season with Seattle U, Coach Barcomb led the Redhawks to a WAC tournament title and was the 15th seed in the NCAA Tournament where Seattle U faced the second seed, Oregon Ducks.

In 1938, the mascot switched from the Maroons to the Chieftains. The name was selected to honor the college's namesake, Chief Seattle. In 2000, the university changed its mascot to the Redhawks.

On June 14, 2011, Seattle U accepted an invitation to join the Western Athletic Conference, becoming a full member for the 2012–2013 season.

Notable alumni

See also
 List of Jesuit sites

References

External links

Seattle University Athletics website

 
1891 establishments in Washington (state)
Association of Catholic Colleges and Universities
Catholic universities and colleges in Washington (state)
Educational institutions established in 1891
First Hill, Seattle
Jesuit universities and colleges in the United States
Roman Catholic Archdiocese of Seattle
Universities and colleges accredited by the Northwest Commission on Colleges and Universities
Universities and colleges in Seattle